Events in the year 1950 in the People's Republic of China.

Incumbents
 Chairman of the Chinese Communist Party – Mao Zedong
 Chairman of the Government – Mao Zedong
 Vice Chairmen of the Government – Zhu De Liu Shaoqi, Song Qingling, Li Jishen, Zhang Lan, Gao Gang
 Premier – Zhou Enlai
 Vice Premiers – Dong Biwu, Chen Yun, Guo Moruo, Huang Yanpei

Governors  
 Governor of Fujian Province – Zhang Dingcheng 
 Governor of Gansu Province – Deng Baoshan
 Governor of Guangdong Province – Ye Jianying 
 Governor of Guizhou Province – Yang Yong 
 Governor of Hebei Province – Yang Xiufeng 
 Governor of Heilongjiang Province – Yu Yifu  
 Governor of Henan Province – Wu Zhipu 
 Governor of Hubei Province – Li Xiannian   
 Governor of Hunan Province – Wang Shoudao  
 Governor of Jiangsu Province – Tan Zhenlin 
 Governor of Jiangxi Province – Shao Shiping 
 Governor of Jilin Province – Zhou Chiheng 
 Governor of Qinghai Province – Zhao Shoushan
 Governor of Shaanxi Province – Ma Mingfang 
 Governor of Shandong Province – Kang Sheng 
 Governor of Shanxi Province – Pei Lisheng 
 Governor of Yunnan Province – Chen Geng 
 Governor of Zhejiang Province – Tan Zhenlin

Events

 6 January – The United Kingdom recognizes the People's Republic of China; the Republic of China severs diplomatic relations with Britain in response.
 9 January – The Israeli government recognizes the People's Republic of China.
 13 January – Finland forms diplomatic relations with the People's Republic of China.
 16 January - Vietnam concluded diplomatic relations with Mainland China.
 31 January – The last Kuomintang troops surrender in mainland China.
 14 February – Cold War: The Soviet Union and the People's Republic of China sign a mutual defense treaty.
 5 March - 1 May – Chinese Civil War: Landing Operation on Hainan Island – a series of battles fought in the Chinese province of Hainan between the nationalists and the communists during Chinese Civil War which resulted in the communist victory.
 7 October – Invasion of Tibet: 40,000 troops of the People's Liberation Army invaded the Tibetan area of Chamdo. The large number of units of the PLA quickly surrounded the outnumbered Tibetan forces. By October 19, 1950, the 5,000 Tibetan troops had surrendered.
 25 November – Korean War: Forces from the People's Republic of China commenced the Second Phase Campaign. The resulting battles at Ch'ongch'on River and Chosin Reservoir expelled the United Nations forces from North Korea.

Births
 July 3 – Zhang Kangkang, Chinese writer.

Deaths
 October 27 – Ren Bishi, a leading figure in the Chinese Communist Party
 November 25 – Mao Anying, the eldest son of Mao Zedong and Yang Kaihui. Anying was killed in action by an air strike during the Korean War.
 Fang Zong'ao (Chinese: 方宗鳌; Wade–Giles: Fang Tsung-ao; 1884 – 19 February 1950) late Qing Dynasty scholar; a popular economist and jurist in the early Republic of China era, and a professor in economics and law.

See also 
 1950 in Chinese film

References 

 
Years of the 20th century in China
China